Matheus Sousa Pereira (born 31 January 1997) is a Brazilian footballer who currently plays as a midfielder for Oita Trinita, on loan from Atlético Goianiense.

Career statistics

Club

Notes

References

External links

1997 births
Living people
Brazilian footballers
Brazilian expatriate footballers
Association football midfielders
Campeonato Brasileiro Série B players
Campeonato Brasileiro Série A players
Figueirense FC players
Atlético Clube Goianiense players
Oita Trinita players
Brazilian expatriate sportspeople in Japan
Expatriate footballers in Japan
Footballers from Rio de Janeiro (city)